The Seven Wonders of the Peak were described in the 17th century by the philosopher Thomas Hobbes in his book De Mirabilibus Pecci: Being The Wonders of the Peak in Darby-shire, Commonly called The Devil's Arse of Peak. The wonders refer to places to visit in the Peak District of Derbyshire in England.

Thomas Hobbes worked for the Dukes of Devonshire at Chatsworth House, as tutor and secretary. After touring the High Peak in 1626, Hobbes published his 84-page Latin poem De Mirabilibus Pecci in 1636. It was published with an English translation in 1676. He recounted:"Of the High Peak are seven wonders writ. Two fonts, two caves. One pallace, mount and pit."These wonders are:

Mary Queen of Scots is known to have visited three of the wonders. By command of Queen Elizabeth I, she was held prisoner at Chatsworth House several times between 1569 and 1584 (her rooms are still called the Queen of Scots Apartments). Mary was granted permission by the Queen to ‘take the cure’ for her rheumatism at St Ann's Well in Buxton. She visited the well, under guard and for up to a month at a time, most years from 1573 to 1584. In 1582 Mary is also supposed to have visited Poole's Cavern in Buxton. Before leaving in 1584, she etched in Latin on the window of her room at the Buxton Old Hall:"Buxton, whose fame thy milk-waters tell, Whom I, perhaps, no more shall see, farewell."Long before Hobbes wrote his poem, the Elizabethan antiquarian William Camden had written of three wonders and three beauties of the High Peak, in his definitive reference book Britannia, first published in 1586. It was written in Latin and later translated into English. He describes:

Hobbes' list of attractions became a popular tourist itinerary for the aristocracy (and with the middle classes too by the 1700s), among them Celia Fiennes. The same wonders were further popularised by poet Charles Cotton (squire of Beresford Hall in Dovedale). In 1681 he wrote his 86 page long poetic essay The Wonders of the Peake. In the 1720s satirist author Daniel Defoe published his Tour thro’ the Whole Island of Great Britain, in which he denounced Hobbes’ and Cotton’s ‘Wonders of the Peak', declaring that only Eldon Hole and Chatsworth were justified.

The Buxton Museum has a 'Wonders of the Peak' exhibit and online collection, including an original edition of Thomas Hobbes' book De Mirabilibus Pecci.

References 

Tourist attractions in Derbyshire
Tourist attractions of the Peak District
History of Derbyshire